Yenish, also spelled Yeniche or Jenische, may refer to:
Yenish people
Yenish language

Language and nationality disambiguation pages